Millside Radio provides hospital radio programmes 24 hours a day for people in King's Mill Hospital in Nottinghamshire, England, on the Mansfield and Ashfield border. It started in 1989 as a part-time service using studios at Queen's Medical Centre, Nottingham, before moving into former offices at King's Mill, where it was officially opened by Jeremy Beadle.

It broadcasts 24 hours a day in high-quality stereo using the hospital's WiFi network across the hospital and via a distribution system free to patients for radio, but which charges for other communications, such as individual bedside wired telephone and television. It is also streamed free online via website, smartphone and smartspeaker.

Staffed entirely by volunteers, it is registered as a charity using the name Millside Hospital Radio.

It has live news and sports coverage broadcast on the hour. Sports updates are included in many live shows during the week. It broadcasts from outside locations, such as Asda Mansfield and B&Q Mansfield, and from events around the hospital.

The station's mascot is called Milly Bear.

References

External links
Millside Radio
Millside Radio Facebook page
Millside Radio Twitter page

Hospital radio stations
Radio stations in Nottinghamshire
Radio stations established in 1989